Christina Ager (born 11 November 1995) is an Austrian alpine skier.

Career
She won a bronze medal at the 2012 Winter Youth Olympics, won two medals at the 2013 European Youth Olympic Winter Festival and competed at the 2014 and 2015 Junior World Championships where her best placement was 5th in 2015.

She made her World Cup debut in November 2013 in Levi, shocking the alpine skiing world with a 4th place. Competing in all disciplines, she made the top 10 again in the 2018–19 season with a 10th place in Val Gardena, 9th place in Cortina d'Ampezzo and lastly a 6th place in the combined in February 2019 in Crans Montana.

She represents the sports club WSV Söll.

References

External links
 
 

1995 births
Living people
People from Kufstein District
Austrian female alpine skiers
Alpine skiers at the 2012 Winter Youth Olympics
Sportspeople from Tyrol (state)
Youth Olympic gold medalists for Austria
20th-century Austrian women
21st-century Austrian women